This is a summary of the electoral history of David Cameron, who served as Prime Minister of the United Kingdom from 2010 to 2016 and Leader of the Conservative Party from 2005 to 2016. He was the Member of Parliament (MP) for Witney from 2001 to 2016.

Parliamentary elections

1997 general election, Stafford

2001 general election, Witney

2005 general election, Witney

2010 general election, Witney

2015 general election, Witney

2005 Conservative Party leadership election

United Kingdom general elections

2010 general election

2015 general election

References

David Cameron
Cameron, David
Cameron, David